Draco is the Greco-Latin word for serpent, or dragon.

Draco or Drako most often refers to:

 Draco (lawgiver) (from Greek: Δράκων; 7th century BC), the first lawgiver of ancient Athens, from whom the term draconian is derived
 Draco Malfoy, a character in the Harry Potter series
 Draco (constellation), a constellation in the northern part of the sky

Draco or Drako may also refer to:

People
 Draco (physician) (from Greek: Δράκων), the name of several physicians in the family of Hippocrates
 Draco Rosa (born 1970), a Puerto Rican songwriter and former member of Puerto Rican boy band Menudo
 Dean Drako, American businessman

Arts, entertainment, and media

Games 
 Draco, a character in the fictional opera The Dream Oath: Maria and Draco in Final Fantasy VI
 Draco, a dragon from the card game Magic: The Gathering
 Draco Centauros, a dragon-like humanoid from the Puyo Puyo video game series

Literature, film, and television 
 Draco (Caminhos do Coração), a character from the 2008 Brazilian telenovela Os Mutantes - Caminhos do Coração

 Draco, the name of the last dragon in the film Dragonheart.
 Draco, a character from Hercules: The Legendary Journeys and Xena: Warrior Princess
 Antares Draco, an Imperial Knight from Star Wars: Legacy
 Jaq Draco, an Inquisitor who is the protagonist of Ian Watson's Inquisition War Trilogy
 Marc Ange Draco, head of European crime syndicate and James Bond's father-in-law in Ian Fleming's novels
 Drako, a character in the Teenage Mutant Ninja Turtles franchise

Music
 Draco and the Malfoys, an American rock band
 "Draco" (song), by Future, 2017

Brand or business
 Draco, a guitar built by B.C. Rich guitars
 Draco, a civilian version of the Pistol Mitralieră model 1963/1965

History 
 Dacian Draco, a Dacian military standard composed of a wolf head and snake tail
 Draco (military standard), a Roman cavalry military standard in the shape of a dragon, adopted after the Dacian Wars

Science and technology 
 DRACO, a group of experimental antiviral drugs
 DraCo, a partly Amiga compatible computer built by MacroSystem AG
 Draco (dwarf galaxy), a dwarf galaxy orbiting the Milky Way
 Draco (lizard), a genus of gliding lizards
 Draco widely used synonym of Dracaena (plant)
 Draco (programming language), a shareware programming language for CP/M and the Amiga
 Draco (rocket engine), an orbital maneuvering thruster being built for the SpaceX Dragon and upper stage of the Falcon 9 spacecraft
 SuperDraco, a liquid rocket engine designed and built by SpaceX. Used for the launch escape system of the SpaceX Dragon 2
 Draco Supercluster (SCL 114), a galaxy supercluster in the constellation Draco
 Draco Linux, a Linux distribution
 Draco, name given by the U.S. cable channel The Weather Channel to the December 2012 North American blizzard
 Demonstration Rocket for Agile Cislunar Operations (DRACO), a US DOD program, using Nuclear thermal rocket
 DRACO, camera module of NASAs DART Mission.

Other uses 
 Draconian constitution, or Draco's code, a 7th-century BC written law code
 Draco Peak, a summit in Alberta, Canada
 Draco Racing, a motorsports team in Italy
 Draco, a prototype of a SPAA version of the Centauro 8x8 fighting vehicle of the Italian Army

See also 

 Draconian (disambiguation)
 Dracula (disambiguation)
 Dracaena (disambiguation)
 Drago (disambiguation)
 Drakon (disambiguation)